Strongylura is a genus of needlefishes from the family Belonidae which is distributed throughout the tropical and warmer temperate waters of the world, including some species which live in freshwater.

Species
Currently, there are 14 recognized species in this genus:
 Strongylura anastomella (Valenciennes, 1846)
 Strongylura exilis (Girard, 1854) (Californian needlefish)
 Strongylura fluviatilis (Regan, 1903)
 Strongylura hubbsi Collette, 1974 (Maya needlefish)
 Strongylura incisa (Valenciennes, 1846) (reef needlefish)
 Strongylura krefftii (Günther, 1866) (long tom)
 Strongylura leiura (Bleeker, 1850) (banded needlefish)
 Strongylura marina (Walbaum, 1792) (Atlantic needlefish)
 Strongylura notata (Poey, 1860)
 S. n. forsythia Breder, 1932
 S. n. notata (Poey, 1860) (redfin needlefish)
 Strongylura scapularis (D. S. Jordan & C. H. Gilbert, 1882) (shoulderspot needlefish)
 Strongylura senegalensis (Valenciennes, 1846) (Senegal needlefish)
 Strongylura strongylura (van Hasselt, 1823) (spottail needlefish)
 Strongylura timucu (Walbaum, 1792) (timucu)
 Strongylura urvillii (Valenciennes, 1846) (Urville's longtom)

Taxonomy
It is thought that the genus Strongylura is not monophyletic.

References

 
Belonidae
Taxa named by Johan Conrad van Hasselt